Edward T. Maloney (May 21, 1928 – August 19, 2016) was an American aviation historian based in Southern California.

He assembled much of the collection of historic airframes displayed at the Planes of Fame Museum at Chino Airport, Chino, California.

Maloney believed that today's scrap is tomorrow's history, and in 1946 began collecting odd airframes for a future museum.  His first item was reportedly a Mitsubishi J8M rocket-powered interceptor.

Maloney opened his first aviation museum at Claremont, California, on January 12, 1957, and then moved to LA/Ontario International Airport, Ontario, California, in the 1960s.  His collection included several military aircraft including a rare P-26 Peashooter, a P-51A, a Hanriot HD.1, a Heinkel He 162, the Northrop N9M flying wing testbed, the nose section of a B-36 Peacemaker bomber. It also includes the last B-17 Flying Fortress bomber in United States Air Force operation, the drone-director Piccadilly Lilly II (44-83684).  This B-17 starred in the 12 O'Clock High television series from 1964 to 1966. Interactive displays included a vintage World War II gunnery training machine.

In 1969, Maloney was forced to move his collection from the Ontario Airport hangar, and chose its present location at Chino Airport.  Maloney remained active in the preservation of aviation history until he died from colon cancer on August 19, 2016, aged 88.

References

Bibliography
 Edward T. Maloney and Frank Ryan. P-26, History of the Famous Boeing P-26 Peashooter. Challenge Publications, 1965.
 Edward T. Maloney and Frank Ryan. Me-262 The Story of the German Air Weapon That Almost Changed the Course of the War... Challenge Publications, 1965.
 Kamikaze (1966) Fallbrook, CA: Aero Publishers Inc.
 Aeronautical Staff of Aero Publishers, Edward T. Maloney and Uwe Feist. Heinkel He 162 "Volksjäger", Aero Series 4. Fallbrook, CA:  Aero Publishers, 1965. .
 Aeronautical Staff of Aero Publishers, Edward T. Maloney and Uwe Feist. Republic P-47 Thunderbolt, Aero Series 6. Fallbrook, CA:  Aero Publishers, 1966. . 
 Aeronautical Staff of Aero Publishers, Edward T. Maloney and Uwe Feist. Junkers Ju 87 "Stuka", Aero Series 8. Fallbrook, CA:  Aero Publishers, 1966. .
 Heinz J. Nowarra and Edward T. Maloney. Dornier Do 335 "Pfeil", Aero series 9. Fallbrook, CA:  Aero Publishers, 1966. .  
 Aeronautical Staff of Aero Publishers, Edward T. Maloney and Uwe Feist. Supermarine Spitfire, Aero Series 10. Fallbrook, CA:  Aero Publishers, 1966. .
 Edward T. Maloney and Uwe Feist. Chance Vought F4U Corsair, Aero Series 11. Fallbrook, CA:  Aero Publishers, 1967. .
 Edward T. Maloney and Uwe Feist. North American P-51 Mustang, Aero Series 15. Fallbrook, CA:  Aero Publishers, 1967. .
 Edward T. Maloney, Uwe Feist and Ronald Ferndock. Messerschmitt 163 "Komet", Aero Series 17. Fallbrook, CA:  Aero Publishers, 1968. .
 Edward T. Maloney. Lockheed P-38 "Lightning", Aero Series 19. Fallbrook, CA:  Aero Publishers, 1968. .
 Edward T. Maloney. Grumman F8F Bearcat, Aero Series 20. Fallbrook, CA:  Aero Publishers, 1969. .
 Edward T. Maloney. Northrop Flying Wings. Buena Park, CA: Planes Of Fame Publishers, 1975. .
 Edward T. Maloney. The Messerschmitt Me-262. Corona del Mar, CA: World War II Publications, 1980. .
 Edward T. Maloney and Thomas E. Doll. Chance Vought F4U Corsair, Aero Series 11, second revised edition. Fallbrook, CA:  Aero Publishers, 1985. .

1928 births
2016 deaths
American historians
American curators